Brachysteles is a genus of minute pirate bugs in the family Lyctocoridae. There are at least three described species in Brachysteles.

Species
These three species belong to the genus Brachysteles:
 Brachysteles espagnoli Ribes, 1984 g
 Brachysteles parvicornis (Costa, 1847) i c g b
 Brachysteles wollastoni Buchanan White, 1879 g
Data sources: i = ITIS, c = Catalogue of Life, g = GBIF, b = Bugguide.net

References

Further reading

 
 
 

Lyctocoridae genera
Articles created by Qbugbot
Lyctocoridae